Putzier is a surname. Notable people with the surname include:

Jeb Putzier (born 1979), American football player
Rollin Putzier (born 1965), American football player